Vittorio Loi (22 November 1942 - 14 October 2015) was an Italian wheelchair fencer who won ten medals at the Summer Paralympics.

Career
He won the Wheelchair Fencing World Championships for thirteen consecutive years from 1962 to 1974. He was a founding member of the Italian Federation of Sports for the Disabled (Federazione Italiana Sport Disabili, FISD) today the Italian Paralympic Committee (Comitato Italiano Paralimpico, IPC) and at International level was vice-president of International Wheelchair and Amputee Sports Federation (IWASF) until 2013.

See also
 Italian multiple medallists at the Summer Paralympics

References

External links
 
 Vittorio Loi at Memoria paralimpica

1942 births
2015 deaths
Paralympic wheelchair fencers of Italy
Paralympic gold medalists for Italy
Paralympic silver medalists for Italy
Paralympic bronze medalists for Italy
Paralympic medalists in wheelchair fencing
Wheelchair fencers at the 1968 Summer Paralympics
wheelchair fencers at the 1972 Summer Paralympics
wheelchair fencers at the 1976 Summer Paralympics
wheelchair fencers at the 1980 Summer Paralympics
Medalists at the 1968 Summer Paralympics
Medalists at the 1972 Summer Paralympics
Medalists at the 1976 Summer Paralympics